The Galician Ecologist Movement, also known as MEG, is an inactive Galician political party founded in 1983 by Constantino Rábade. The party was the first environmentalist political organization created in Galicia and run in several local elections. In 2011 it was incorporated into the Land Party.

See also

Environmentalism
Green politics

External links
Partido da Terra

References

Political parties in Galicia (Spain)
Green political parties in Spain
Defunct green political parties
Defunct political parties in Spain